The list of United States naval aircraft contains types currently used by United States Navy and the United States Marine Corps. For a complete list of naval aircraft designated under pre-1962 United States Navy designation systems, see List of United States Navy aircraft designations (pre-1962); for aircraft without formal designations, see List of undesignated military aircraft of the United States. For a list of all naval aircraft designated under the post-1962 unified Department of Defense designations, see List of military aircraft of the United States.

Aircraft

Current inventory

See also
 United States Marine Corps Aviation
 List of active United States Air Force aircraft
 United States Army Aviation Branch
 List of equipment of the United States Coast Guard

References

External links
 Navy Fact File

!Aircraft
Aircraft list